Alex Perez may refer to:
Álex Pérez (footballer, born 1985), Spanish football midfielder 
Álex Pérez (footballer, born 1991), Spanish football defender
Alex Perez (fighter) (born 1992), American mixed martial artist
Alex Pérez (basketball) (born 1993), American basketball player
Alex Perez, actor who appeared in season 11 of Modern Family
Alex Perez (born 2000), American professional rodeo cowboy who specializes in bull riding

See also
Alix Perez, Belgian DJ and producer